Flow Free is a puzzle game app for iOS and Android released by American studio Big Duck Games in June 2012.

Gameplay
The game presents numberlink puzzles. Each puzzle has a grid of squares with pairs of colored dots occupying some of the squares. The objective is to connect dots of the same color by drawing 'pipes' between them such that the entire grid is occupied by pipes. However, pipes may not intersect. Difficulty is primarily determined by the size of the grid, ranging from 5x5 squares (4 colors) to 15x15 squares (up to 16 colors). Many grids are "open" and some contain "walls" which must be navigated around. Whenever a level is completed, a check mark will appear on the level select icon to indicate that the puzzle is solved, while a star indicates a "perfect" game, where the player finished the puzzle with the fewest moves required. The app also contains additional paid packs as well as a time trial mode.

Expansions
Big Duck Games has also released three expansions in the series. The first expansion, "Flow Free: Bridges", was released on November 8, 2012 at a fixed price. In this expansion, pipes can be made to intersect through pre-made bridges. The second expansion, "Flow Free: Hexes", was released on October 12, 2016, and features both free and paid premium puzzles. The gameplay is similar to "Flow Free" except the layout resembles hexagons instead of squares. The third expansion, "Flow Free: Warps", was released on August 8, 2017. This expansion allows pipes to warp from an edge of the map to another edge of the map.

References

External links
Official website

2012 video games
Android (operating system) games
IOS games
Noodlecake Games games
Puzzle video games
Single-player video games
Video games developed in the United States
Windows Phone games